Carlos Montalbán y Merino (June 5, 1904March 28, 1991) was a Mexican character actor.

Early life
Montalbán was born in Torreón in Coahuila, Mexico, the son of Ricarda Merino Jiménez and Genaro Balbino Montalbán Busano, a store manager. His parents were Spanish.

Career
Montalbán was the older brother of actor Ricardo Montalbán and is remembered for portraying two different characters named "Vargas" in well-remembered films; The Out-of-Towners (1970) starring Jack Lemmon, and Woody Allen's Bananas (1971).  His best remembered role is likely in the American boxing drama The Harder They Fall (1956), where he plays the sympathetic manager of a heavyweight contender.

He appeared as "El Exigente" in a series of coffee advertisements for Savarin Coffee in the 1960s and 1970s.  Montalbán was also a renowned voice-over actor and announcer, best known as the official Spanish language voice for Marlboro cigarettes worldwide.

Death
Montalbán died on March 28, 1991, in his Manhattan home in New York City of cardiovascular disease and was survived by his wife Mary, a New Yorker, two brothers, Pedro and the actor Ricardo Montalbán, and a sister, Carmen, also from Torreon, Mexico.

Filmography

References

External links
 
 Fandango filmography

1904 births
1991 deaths
Mexican emigrants to the United States
Mexican male film actors
Male actors from Coahuila
20th-century Mexican male actors
People from Torreón